Benjamin Joseph Worrall (born 7 December 1975), in Swindon, Wiltshire, England, was an English footballer who played as a central midfielder in the Football League.

Career
Worrall came through the youth team at Swindon Town and made his professional debut for the Robins on 29 April 1995 against Portsmouth away at Fratton Park. He was brought into the first team by manager Steve McMahon for the final games of the 1995–96 campaign.

References

External links

1975 births
Living people
English footballers
Sportspeople from Swindon
Association football midfielders
Scarborough F.C. players
Swindon Town F.C. players
Exeter City F.C. players
Stevenage F.C. players
English Football League players